Equol (4',7-isoflavandiol) is an isoflavandiol estrogen metabolized from daidzein, a type of isoflavone found in soybeans and other plant sources, by bacterial flora in the intestines. While endogenous estrogenic hormones such as estradiol are steroids, equol is a nonsteroidal estrogen. Only about 30–50% of people have intestinal bacteria that make equol.

History 
(S)-Equol was first isolated from horse urine in 1932, and the name was suggested by this equine connection. Since then, equol has been found in the urine or plasma of many other animal species, although these animals have significant differences in their ability to metabolize daidzein into equol. In 1980, scientists reported the discovery of equol in humans.  The ability of (S)-equol to play a role in the treatment of estrogen- or androgen-mediated diseases or disorders was first proposed in 1984.

Chemical structure
Equol is a compound that can exist in two mirror-image forms known as enantiomers: (S)-equol and (R)-equol.  (S)-equol is produced in humans and animals with the ability to metabolize the soy isoflavone daidzein, while (R)-equol can be chemically synthesized. The molecular and physical structure of (S)-equol is similar to that of the hormone estradiol. (S)-Equol preferentially binds estrogen receptor beta.

Pharmacology

Estrogen receptor binding
(S)-equol is a nonsteroidal, selective agonist of ERβ (Ki = 16 nM) with 13-fold selectivity for ERβ over ERα. Relative to (S)-equol, (R)-equol is less potent and binds to ERα (Ki = 50 nM) with 3.5-fold selectivity over ERβ. (S)-Equol has about 2% of estradiol's binding affinity for human estrogen receptor alpha (ERα) and 20% of estradiol's binding affinity for human estrogen receptor beta (ERβ). The preferential binding of (S)-equol to ERβ vs. ERα and in comparison to that of estradiol suggests the molecule may share some of the characteristics of a selective estrogen receptor modulator (SERM). Equol has been found to act as an agonist of the GPER (GPR30).

Pharmacokinetics
(S)-Equol is a very stable molecule that essentially remains unchanged when digested, and this lack of further metabolism explains its very quick absorption and high bioavailability.
When (S)-equol is consumed, it is rapidly absorbed and achieves a Tmax (rate of peak plasma concentration) in two to three hours. In comparison, the Tmax of daidzein is 4 to 10 hours because daidzein exists in glycoside (with a glucose side chain) form. The body must convert daidzein to its aglycone form (without the glucose side chain) via removal of the sugar side chain during digestion before it can use daidzein.  If consumed directly in aglycone form, daidzein has a Tmax of one to three hours.
The percent fractional elimination of (S)-equol in urine after oral administration is high and in some adults can reach close to 100 percent. The percent fractional elimination of daidzein is much lower at 30 to 40 percent.

Production in humans
To  produce (S)-equol after soy consumption, humans must have certain strains of bacteria living within their intestines.  Twenty-one different strains of intestinal bacteria cultured from humans have been shown to have the ability to transform daidzein into (S)-equol or a related intermediate compound.  Several studies indicate that only 25 to 30 percent of the adult populations of Western countries produce (S)-equol after eating soy foods containing isoflavones, while 50 to 60 percent of adults from Japan, Korea, and China are equol-producers. Vegetarians have also been reported to be more capable of transforming daidzein ito (S)-equol.  Seaweed and dairy consumption can enhance the production of equol. The ability of a person to produce (S)-equol is determined by testing people who have not taken any antibiotics for at least a month. For this standardized test, the individual drinks two 240 milliliter glasses of soy milk or eats a soy food equivalent for three days. The (S)-equol concentration in each test subject's urine is determined on day four.

Equol producing bacteria
While many more bacteria are involved in the related intermediate process of equol production, such as conversion of daidzin to daidzein, or genistein to 5-Hydroxy-equol, the bacteria that achieve the complete conversion of daidzein to (S)-equol, include:
 Adlercreutzia equolifaciens
 Asaccharobacter celatus AHU1763
 Bacteroides ovatus
 Bifidobacterium
 Bifidobacterium animalis
 Coriobacteriaceae sp MT1B9
 Eggerthella sp YY7918
 Enterococcus faecium
 Eubacterium sp D1 and D2
 Finegoldia magna
 Lactobacillus mucosae
 Lactobacillus sp Niu-O16
 Lactococcus garvieae (Lc 20-92)
 Ruminococcus productus
 Slackia sp HE8
 Slackia equolifaciens (Strain DZE)
 Streptococcus intermedius
 Veillonella sp

Conversion by Bifidobacterium has only been reported once by Tsangalis et al. in 2002 and not reproduced since.Bifidobacteria: Genomics and Molecular Aspects Mixed cultures such as Lactobacillus sp. Niu-O16 and Eggerthella sp. Julong 732 can also produce (S)-equol.Bifidobacteria: Genomics and Molecular Aspects Some equol producing bacteria, as implied by their nomenclature, are Adlercreutzia equolifaciens, Slackia equolifaciens and Slackia isoflavoniconvertens.

Health effects

Skin health 

The topical effects of equol as an anti-aging substance have been shown in different studies.  The effects result from both molecular and structural changes to the skin. Equol can, for instance, lead to an increase in telomere length. As an antioxidant, equol can decrease the aging process by reducing damage caused by reactive oxygen species (ROS). It may also act as a protective anti-photoaging substance by inhibiting acute UVA- induced lipid peroxidation. In addition, equol may  have a positive impact on epigenetic regulation. Equol's phytoestrogenic properties may also affect skin health. Reduction of dark circles and eye wrinkles after  treatment with equol has been reported. Equol may also protect skin from damage by pollution due to its anti-oxidative and anti-inflammatory properties.

Each of the enantiomers and the racemic mixture of both enantiomers have different characteristics, bioavailabilities and molecular effects. According to one study, (RS)-equol provided the greatest overall improvement in skin health, especially when applied topically.

Other health effects 

Beyond topical effects, equol has been shown to relieve menopausal symptoms such as hot flashes and muscle and joint pain. (RS)-equol was also reported to reduce symptoms associated with menopausal vaginal atrophy, such as vaginal itching, vaginal dryness and pain with intercourse and cause positive shifts in the vaginal bacterial population, cell composition, and pH.

See also
 Daidzein
 Estrogen receptor
 Genistein
 Liquiritigenin
 Menerba
 Prinaberel
 WAY-200070
 Diarylpropionitrile

References

GPER agonists
Isoflavandiols
Phytoestrogens
Steroid sulfotransferase inhibitors
Selective ERβ agonists